Marcos Galvão (born 23 June 1981) is a Brazilian professional mixed martial artist currently competing in the Featherweight division of the Professional Fighters League. A professional competitor since 2003, Galvão peaked at a global ranking of No. 2 among Bantamweights in August 2007 and has also formerly competed for the WEC, Shooto, Jungle Fight, and Bellator, where he is the former Bantamweight World Champion. Galvao's nickname "Louro" means "blonde" in Portuguese, because he often dyes his hair this color.

Background
Marcos Galvão was born and raised in the city of Manaus located in the state of Amazonas, Brazil. Marcos began practicing Judo when he was 11 years old before transitioning into Brazilian Jiu-Jitsu shortly after, training under Master Nonato Machado until moving to Rio de Janeiro at the age of 13. It was in Rio de Janeiro where Lôro started training heavily in Mixed Martial Arts and where he received his black belt in Brazilian Jiu-Jitsu from the hands of Nova União founder André Pederneiras who would be his coach for the most part of his career. It was under Dedé's guidance that Lôro started making a mark in the sports lower ranks, earning a few very important titles in the blue, purple and brown belt divisions, including an impressive world title at brown belt at the age of 16, being one of the youngest competitors to ever win the competition at the brown belt level. In 2003 Marcos was awarded his black belt, and shortly after he started pursuing a career in mixed martial arts. After a good start fighting in organizations like Shooto and traveling to Japan where he amounted wins that carried him to the WEC (considered at the time, the prime organization for MMA lighter weight competitors), Galvão hit a rough slope, and lost two fights in a row at the WEC. That was when his good friend Vítor Ribeiro invited Galvão to come to New York and start training with him, Lôro gladly accepted the offer and moved to the United States, where he trained full-time at Long Island MMA and also Church Street Boxing Gym with striking coach Jason Strout. Lôro thrived in this new environment that coupled with his determination, and dedication to the sport, earned him a Bellator Bantamweight Tournament win, after a few Grappler's Quest and NAGA competitions and wins, plus wins in Washington Combat and the New Jersey based organization Ring of Combat, where he won the Featherweight championship title. After a few hurdles in his career, injuries, including facing-off against one of his teammates, and deciding to change teams due to training difficulties, Lôro defeated Joe Warren and earned the Bellator Bantamweight title.

Mixed martial arts career

Shooto
Galvao made his professional debut in 2003 for the Japanese Shooto organization, where he competed primarily, compiling a record of 6-1 before being signed by the WEC.

WEC
Galvão made his WEC and U.S. debut at WEC 31 against Brian Bowles. Galvão lost the fight via KO in the second round, and then took a fight outside of the WEC before returning to the promotion. He returned to suffer another KO loss, this time to Damacio Page at WEC 39.

Shooto Title Fight
Following a loss in his WEC debut to Bowles, Galvão returned to Japan to challenge the undefeated Shooto Bantamweight Champion Masakatsu Ueda. The fight ended in a draw, resulting in Ueda retaining the title.

Bellator MMA
Galvão was a part of the main event for Bellator 41 against Joe Warren, the Bellator Featherweight Champion. The fight was contested at a Catchweight of 137 lbs. In the fight Galvão negated a majority of Warren's offense for the first two rounds by showing strong takedown defense, taking down Warren multiple times, taking Warren's back, and executing good knees from the clinch. In the third round he was taken down by Warren and controlled throughout the round. At the end of the fight, Bellator color commentator, Jimmy Smith, believed Galvão won the fight 29-28. Along with Smith, many top MMA sites, (MMAJunkie, Sherdog, MMAFighting, MMASpot), all believed that Galvão won the fight by 29-28. It was then announced that Warren had won the fight via unanimous decision (30-27, 29-28, 29-28).

During an MMAJunkie radio interview with Bellator CEO, Bjorn Rebney, Rebney confirmed that Galvão will take part in the Bellator Season Five Bantamweight Tournament. Galvao fought former WEC Bantamweight Champion Chase Beebe in a quarterfinal match-up on 24 September 2011 and won via split decision.  In the semifinals, Galvão lost a very close fight against Cuban Alexis Vila at Bellator 55, losing by split decision (29-28, 29-28, 27-30). Though Galvao lost the fight, he still received his win bonus.

Galvão returned for the Bellator Season Six Bantamweight Tournament.  He won his quarterfinal and semifinal fights against Ed West and Travis Marx respectively before reaching the finals. It was there that he scored a second round TKO against Luis Nogueira to win the tournament.

His next fight was against his good friend and teammate Eduardo Dantas for the Bellator Bantamweight Championship. He lost via knockout in the second round.

In his next bout for the promotion, Galvão faced Tom McKenna at Bellator 108. Galvão defeated McKenna in the second round due to strikes.

Galvão then faced Thomas Vasquez at Bellator 118 on 2 May 2014. Galvão used takedowns and ground-and-pound to defeat Vasquez via unanimous decision.

Galvão challenged Joe Warren for the Bellator Bantamweight Championship in a rematch on 27 March 2015 at Bellator 135. He won the fight via verbal submission in the second round after Warren screamed out in pain causing the referee to stop the fight. This marked the first submission win of Galvão's career and avenged his previous loss to Warren.

Galvão was scheduled to face former teammate Eduardo Dantas in a rematch for the Bellator Bantamweight Championship title at Bellator 150, but the match was scrapped following a last-minute illness suffered by Galvao. Prior, the rematch was expected to take place at Bellator 144, however, this was cancelled, after an injury to Dantas. The rematch eventually took place on 17 June 2016 at Bellator 156. Galvão lost the match by unanimous decision.

Following the loss of his title, Galvão defeated L.C. Davis via split decision at Bellator 166 on 2 December 2016.

Moving up to the featherweight division, Galvão faced Emmanuel Sanchez at Bellator 175 on 31 March 2017. He lost the fight via unanimous decision.

Again fighting at featherweight, Galvão returned at Bellator 189 on 1 December 2017 against UFC veteran, Sam Sicilia. He lost the fight via unanimous decision.

Galvao's Bellator contract expired in February 2018 and he became a free agent.

PFL
Following his departure from Bellator, Galvao signed with the Professional Fighters League. He faced Nazareno Malegarie at PFL 1 on 7 June 2018. He lost the fight by unanimous decision.

Galvao faced Max Coga at PFL 4 on 19 July 2018. He lost the fight by a third-round technical knockout.

Galvao faced Elvis Silva at Shooto Brazil 91 on 5 April 2019. He lost the fight by unanimous decision.

Championships and accomplishments
Bellator MMA
Bellator Bantamweight World Championship (One time)
Bellator Season Six Bantamweight Tournament Winner
MMAJunkie.com
2015 March Submission of the Month vs. Joe Warren

Mixed martial arts record

|-
|Loss
|align=center|18–12–1
|Elvis Silva
| Decision (unanimous)
| Shooto Brazil 91
|
|align=center|3
|align=center|5:00
|Rio de Janeiro, Brazil
|
|-
|Loss
|align=center|18–11–1
|Max Coga
| TKO (punches)
| PFL 4
|
|align=center|3
|align=center|2:19
|Uniondale, New York, United States
|
|-
|Loss
|align=center|18–10–1
|Nazareno Malegarie
| Decision (Unanimous)
| PFL 1
|
|align=center|3
|align=center|5:00
|New York City, New York, United States
|
|-
|Loss
|align=center|18–9–1
|Sam Sicilia
|Decision (unanimous)
|Bellator 189
|
|align=center|3
|align=center|5:00
|Thackerville, Oklahoma, United States
|
|-
|Loss
|align=center| 18–8–1
|Emmanuel Sanchez
| Decision (unanimous)
|Bellator 175
|
|align=center|3
|align=center|5:00
|Rosemont, Illinois, United States
| 
|-
|Win
|align=center| 18–7–1
|LC Davis
| Decision (split)
|Bellator 166
|
|align=center|3
|align=center|5:00
|Thackerville, Oklahoma, United States
|
|-
|Loss
|align=center| 17–7–1
|Eduardo Dantas
| Decision (unanimous)
|Bellator 156
|
|align=center|5
|align=center|5:00
|Fresno, California, United States
|
|-
|Win
|align=center| 17–6–1
|Joe Warren
|Verbal Submission (kneebar)
|Bellator 135
|
|align=center|2
|align=center|0:45
|Thackerville, Oklahoma, United States
|
|-
| Win
| align=center| 16–6–1
| Thomas Vasquez
| Decision (unanimous)
| Bellator 118
| 
| align=center| 3
| align=center| 5:00
| Atlantic City, New Jersey, United States
| 
|-
| Win
| align=center| 15–6–1
| Tom McKenna
| TKO (punches)
| Bellator 108
| 
| align=center| 1
| align=center| 4:29
| Atlantic City, New Jersey, United States
| 
|-
| Win
| align=center| 14–6–1
| Shely Santana
| TKO (punches)
| Shooto Brazil: Manaus
| 
| align=center| 2
| align=center| 2:00
| Manaus, Amazonas, Brazil
| 
|-
| Loss
| align=center| 13–6–1
| Eduardo Dantas
| KO (punches)
| Bellator 89
| 
| align=center| 2
| align=center| 3:01
| Charlotte, North Carolina, United States
|
|-
| Win
| align=center| 13–5–1
| Luis Nogueira
| TKO (elbows)
| Bellator 73
| 
| align=center| 2
| align=center| 4:20
| Tunica, Mississippi, United States
| 
|-
| Win
| align=center| 12–5–1
| Travis Marx
| Decision (unanimous)
| Bellator 68
| 
| align=center| 3
| align=center| 5:00
| Atlantic City, New Jersey, United States
| 
|-
| Win
| align=center| 11–5–1
| Ed West
| Decision (unanimous)
| Bellator 65
| 
| align=center| 3
| align=center| 5:00
| Atlantic City, New Jersey, United States
| 
|-
| Loss
| align=center| 10–5–1
| Alexis Vila
| Decision (split)
| Bellator 55
| 
| align=center| 3
| align=center| 5:00
| Yuma, Arizona, United States
| 
|-
| Win
| align=center| 10–4–1
| Chase Beebe
| Decision (split)
| Bellator 51
| 
| align=center| 3
| align=center| 5:00
| Canton, Ohio, United States
| 
|-
| Loss
| align=center| 9–4–1
| Joe Warren
| Decision (unanimous)
| Bellator 41
| 
| align=center| 3
| align=center| 5:00
| Yuma, Arizona, United States
| 
|-
| Win
| align=center| 9–3–1
| Ryan Vaccaro
| Decision (unanimous)
| Ring of Combat 33
| 
| align=center| 3
| align=center| 5:00
| Atlantic City, New Jersey, United States
| 
|-
| Win
| align=center| 8–3–1
| Jacob Kirwan
| Decision (unanimous)
| Ring of Combat 31
| 
| align=center| 3
| align=center| 4:00
| Atlantic City, New Jersey, United States
| 
|-
| Win
| align=center| 7–3–1
| David Derby
| TKO (punches)
| Washington Combat: Battle of the Legends
| 
| align=center| 1
| align=center| 1:37
| Washington, District of Columbia, United States
| 
|-
| Loss
| align=center| 6–3–1
| Damacio Page
| KO (punches)
| WEC 39
| 
| align=center| 1
| align=center| 0:18
| Corpus Christi, Texas, United States
| 
|-
| Draw
| align=center| 6–2–1
| Masakatsu Ueda
| Draw
| Shooto: Shooto Tradition 3
| 
| align=center| 3
| align=center| 5:00
| Tokyo, Japan
| 
|-
| Loss
| align=center| 6–2
| Brian Bowles
| KO (punch)
| WEC 31
| 
| align=center| 2
| align=center| 2:09
| Las Vegas, Nevada, United States
| 
|-
| Win
| align=center| 6–1
| Kenji Osawa
| Decision (majority)
| Shooto: Back To Our Roots 3
| 
| align=center| 3
| align=center| 5:00
| Tokyo, Japan
| 
|-
| Win
| align=center| 5–1
| Naoya Uematsu
| Decision (unanimous)
| Fury FC 1: Warlords Unleashed
| 
| align=center| 3
| align=center| 5:00
| Sao Paulo, Brazil
| 
|-
| Win
| align=center| 4–1
| Fredson Paixão
| Decision (unanimous)
| Jungle Fight 6
| 
| align=center| 3
| align=center| 5:00
| Manaus, Brazil
| 
|-
| Loss
| align=center| 3–1
| Akitoshi Hokazono
| Decision (unanimous)
| Shooto: 9/23 in Korakuen Hall
| 
| align=center| 3
| align=center| 5:00
| Tokyo, Japan
| 
|-
| Win
| align=center| 3–0
| Jin Akimoto
| Decision (unanimous)
| Shooto: 9/26 in Kourakuen Hall
| 
| align=center| 3
| align=center| 5:00
| Tokyo, Japan
| 
|-
| Win
| align=center| 2–0
| Shuichiro Katsumura
| Decision (unanimous)
| Shooto 2004: 1/24 in Korakuen Hall
| 
| align=center| 3
| align=center| 5:00
| Tokyo, Japan
| 
|-
| Win
| align=center| 1–0
| Masato Shiozawa
| Decision (majority)
| Shooto: 5/4 in Korakuen Hall
| 
| align=center| 3
| align=center| 5:00
| Tokyo, Japan
|

Personal
Galvão is married to his wife Paula. The couple currently reside in California where Galvão trains and teaches Brazilian Jiu-Jitsu and Mixed Martial Arts.

References

External links
 Marcos Galvao at PFL
 

1981 births
Living people
Brazilian male mixed martial artists
Bantamweight mixed martial artists
Mixed martial artists utilizing Brazilian jiu-jitsu
Brazilian practitioners of Brazilian jiu-jitsu
Brazilian emigrants to the United States
People awarded a black belt in Brazilian jiu-jitsu
People from Long Island City, Queens
Bellator MMA champions
People from Manaus
Sportspeople from Amazonas (Brazilian state)